Arman Alizad (born 12 January 1971) is an Iranian-Finnish master tailor, fashion columnist and TV personality. He is best known for the martial arts series Kill Arman, which has aired in over 100 countries around the world. Alizad has also hosted several other Finnish TV series, such as Dresscode, Unisex, Loman Tarpeessa and Arman Reilaa.

Early life
Alizad was born in Tehran, Iran, in 1971. When the Islamic revolution started in 1979, his family first escaped to the United States and eventually Finland, where his grandparents had been living. He has lived there ever since. He was active as a child and enjoyed skateboarding and football.

Tailoring career
Alizad graduated from a basic tailoring school in 1992, and became an apprentice to master tailor Jouni Korhonen. Alizad passed the master tailor's test in 1997. 

He co-owns the Finnish Pukustudio clothing company with Sonja Raassina, one of the last remaining master tailors in Finland.

TV career
Alizad started his television career with the fashion show Dresscode in 2001. Since then he has done another fashion show (Unisex), two travel shows (Loman Tarpeessa, Arman Reilaa), and one martial arts TV series, Kill Arman. His more recent series are Arman ja viimeinen ristiretki (Beyond Human Boundaries), 2013–) and Arman pohjantähden alla (Arman under the North Star, 2016–).

In Viimeinen ristiretki, he visits people and places that are completely outside "western culture". The show won the 2014 Golden Venla for best TV reality series and for Alizad as best performer.

In Pohjantähden alla he travels inside Finland to show things that others close their eyes to. This show won the Golden Venla for best documentary in 2017. Alizad won for best performer again in 2016 and 2017.

International fame
In 2009, Kill Arman made a distribution deal with the British TV distribution company DRG. Between 2009 and 2011, the series was sold to over 100 countries, making Alizad an internationally known TV personality. The series airs, for example, on BBC Knowledge, Extreme Sports Channel and Jim.

Personal life
Alizad has three daughters. He is divorced, having been married twice.

References

External links

1971 births
Living people
Finnish television presenters
Iranian emigrants to Finland
Finnish people of Iranian descent
Finnish tailors
Mass media people from Tehran